Bakelse-Jeanna (1702–1788), was a Swedish pastry-seller, the name signifying "Pastry-Jeanna". She was a well known and distinctive character in Stockholm at that time, and often used as a figure within Swedish plays, songs and literature during the 18th and 19th centuries.

Reality and fiction
Jeanna originated from Åland, and spent her life as a street seller (månglerska) of cakes in Stockholm, where she became a familiar figure. She came to be included in fiction during her lifetime.

She was a character in the comedy Donnerpamp by Carl Israel Hallman from 1782.
She came to be mentioned as a minor character in many works of Swedish literature during the 19th century. A song about her runs:

The name "Bakelse-Jeanna" was long used in Stockholm as a name for female pastry street vendors.

See also
 Gumman Strömberg
 Augusta Dorothea Eklund

References

Further reading
 Acta Philologica Scandinavica, Vol. 10, Munksgaard, 1936

External links
 Portrait on Flickr

1702 births
18th-century Swedish businesspeople
1788 deaths
Swedish pastries
Businesspeople from Stockholm
Street vendors
Carl Michael Bellman
Gustavian era people
18th-century Swedish businesswomen